The 2012 Formula LO season was the inaugural Formula LO season and the thirteenth season of the former Formula Lista Junior. It began on 19 May at the Red Bull Ring and ended on 13 October at Autodromo Nazionale Monza after twelve races.

Teams and drivers
 All cars were powered by BMW engines, and Mygale FB02 chassis.

Race calendar and results

Championship standings

Drivers' championship

Rookies' Championship

Teams' Championship

References

External links
 Official website

Formula LO
Formula LO
Formula Lista Junior
LO